Helen M. Meyer (born February 24, 1954) is an American lawyer and former judge from the state of Minnesota. She most recently served as an associate justice of the Minnesota Supreme Court.

Meyer graduated from the University of Minnesota in 1976 with a degree in social work. She received a J.D. degree in 1982 from William Mitchell College of Law in Saint Paul.

Before her appointment, Meyer worked as a civil trial lawyer and mediator for more than 20 years. Her civil trial practice included mediation and arbitration work. She was the owner of Meyer and Associates in St. Louis Park, since 1996. In 1987, she was a founding partner of the law firm Pritzker and Meyer in Minneapolis. Before that, she was an associate attorney with the Minneapolis law firm Schwebel, Goetz, Sieben and Hanson.

From 1999 to 2002, Meyer was a member of the Minnesota Judicial Merit Selection Commission. The commission makes recommendations on state judicial appointments. She was appointed to the Supreme Court in 2002 by Governor Jesse Ventura, and was sworn in on August 5 of that year.

Meyer joined the faculty at William Mitchell College of Law after leaving the bench.

References

External links
Judge Profile: Associate Justice Helen M. Meyer, State of Minnesota Judicial Branch.
Justice Helen M. Meyer Official Website

1955 births
Living people
Minnesota lawyers
University of Minnesota College of Education and Human Development alumni
Justices of the Minnesota Supreme Court
William Mitchell College of Law alumni
21st-century American women judges
21st-century American judges